Alfred Edward Woodley Mason (7 May 1865 – 22 November 1948), known as A. E. W. Mason, was an English novelist, playwright, actor, army officer, intelligence agent and – for a short period – a politician. He is best remembered for his 1902 novel of courage and cowardice in wartime, The Four Feathers, and as the creator of Inspector Hanaud, a French detective who was an early template for Agatha Christie's Hercule Poirot.

Mason's prolific output included over 30 novels as well as plays, short stories and articles. Many of his novels were adapted for the screen, several multiples times. During the 1910s and 1920s he worked closely with many film directors of the silent era.

Inspector Hanaud novels 

Hanaud also features in the short story The Ginger King (1940), and makes a brief appearance in The Sapphire (1933). The 1931 volume A. E. W. Mason Omnibus: Inspector Hanaud's Investigations is a collection of the first three novels with an introduction by the author.

Other novels

Short story collections

Plays 

An adaptation by Anne Crawford Flexnor of the novel Miranda of the Balcony was performed in New York in 1901, and at The Empire Theatre Huddersfield on 2 September 1901.

Uncollected Short Stories

Non-fiction

Film and TV adaptations 
This is a list of adaptations by other writers of works by A. E. W. Mason.

References

Bibliography

External links
 
  

Bibliographies by writer
Bibliographies of British writers
Novels by A. E. W. Mason